Governor Randolph may refer to:

Beverley Randolph (1754–1797), 8th Governor of Virginia
Edmund Randolph (1753–1813), 7th Governor of Virginia
Peyton Randolph (governor) (1779–1828), Acting Governor of Virginia from 1811 to 1812
Theodore Fitz Randolph (1826–1883), 22nd Governor of New Jersey
Thomas Mann Randolph Jr. (1768–1828), 21st Governor of Virginia